The 2005 Central American Junior and Youth Championships in Athletics were held at the Estadio de Atletismo del Instituto Nicaragüense de Deportes in Managua, Nicaragua, between May 21–22, 2005. 
Organized by the Central American Isthmus Athletic Confederation (CADICA), it was the 18th edition of the Junior (U-20) and the 13th edition of the Youth (U-18) competition. A total of 80 events were contested, 40 by boys and 40 by girls. 

Medal summary
Complete results can be found on the CADICA and on the CACAC webpage.

Junior

Boys (U-20)

Girls (U-20)

Youth

Boys (U-18)

Girls (U-18)

Medal table (unofficial)
The medal table was published.

Team trophies
The placing table for team trophy awarded to the 1st place overall team (boys and girls categories) was published.

Overall

Participation
A total number of 250 athletes and officials were reported to participate in
the event. Belize, El Salvador, and Honduras did not participate because of bad
weather conditions caused by Hurricane Adrian.  The number of athletes of some teams participating in the event was reported.

 (52)
 Panamá (30)

References

 
Ath
Central American Junior
Central American Junior
International athletics competitions hosted by Nicaragua
2005 in youth sport